Heinrich Strobel (31 May 1898 in Regensburg – 18 August 1970 in Baden-Baden) was a German musicologist.

Life 
Strobel, the son of a wholesale merchant, attended the grammar-school in Regensburg, took part in the First World War and worked from 1918 at the Stadt-theater in Regensburg as Répétiteur. After that he studied musicology at the Ludwig Maximilian University of Munich with Adolf Sandberger und Theodor Kroyer. In 1921 he became music critic of the Thüringischen Allgemeinen in Erfurt. In 1922 he graduated to the degree of Doctor of Philosophy (D. Phil.) with his Dissertation on Johann Wilhelm Häßler's Life and Work.

In 1927–1932 he was occupied as music critic with the Berlin Financial Newspaper. In 1933 and 1934 he was on the editorial staff (Munzinger speaks of him as Editor Publisher) of the Journal for New Music called Melos and for the successor-journal Neues Musikblatt. In 1934–1938 he worked for the Berliner Tageblatt, for which, under the pseudonym Karl Frahm, he also wrote cookery recipes and a Cookery Book. In 1935 he was denounced as a 'Music-Bolshevist' by the Militant League for German Culture. When Strobel made his second marriage to a woman (Hilda Levy) designated a 'Jewess' by the racialist Nuremberg Laws, he acquired a Special Permit for Publication from the Nazi regime. From 1 February 1939 he worked for the Deutsche Allgemeine Zeitung, from April 1939 as Foreign Correspondent in Paris, and during the period of the German occupation. In 1940 he published a biography of Claude Debussy in the Zürich Atlantis Press (founded by Martin Hürlimann). Under a pseudonym he also wrote for a supplement of Goebbels's newspaper Das Reich. Strobel, who at first was called up for the military reserve, was drafted into the Landsturm after the Allied Invasion of northern France in Summer 1944, and became a prisoner of war in the Liberation of Paris.

After the Second World War (December 1945) Strobel was employed by the newly founded Südwestrundfunk (SWR) (the broadcasting authority in Rheinland-Pfalz) in Baden-Baden, where he became leader of the Music Department. From 1956 to 1969 he was President of the International Society for Contemporary Music.

Works 
Strobel championed New Music right from the start of his work as a music critic. In this way he took up the cause of the works of Paul Hindemith, Igor Stravinsky, Kurt Weill and Ernst Krenek. His biography of Hindemith was published in 1928 by Schott Music. As Leader of the Music Department of the SWR he employed the conductors Hans Rosbaud and Ernest Bour, under whose direction the Südwestrundfunk (SWR) Symphony Orchestra became a pre-eminent Ensemble in the field of New Music. He promoted very many young talents, among them the composers Pierre Boulez, Karlheinz Stockhausen, and Krzysztof Penderecki. From 1947 he was publisher-editor of Melos. The revival of the Donaueschingen Festival in the early 1950s was effectively owing to his initiative. There, too, were generally first presented the debut performances of very numerous compositions which the SWR presented at his instigation. These presentations included most notably Hans Werner Henze, Wolfgang Fortner, Bernd Alois Zimmermann, Luigi Nono, Werner Egk and many other exponents of New Music.

He wrote the libretti for three operas of Rolf Liebermann, namely, Leonore 40/45 (1952), Penelope (1954) and Die Schule der Frauen (1955).

The Heinrich Strobel Foundation and the Experimental Studio of the Heinrich Strobel Foundation of the Südwestrundfunk are named after him.

Awards 
 1952: Arnold Schönberg Medal
 1957: Cross of the Légion d'Honneur (Knight)
 1961: Doctor of Philosophy (honoris causa) in the University of Basel

Sources 
 'Heinrich Strobel, Musikwissenschaftler', in Munzinger-Archiv: Internationales Biographisches Archiv, 40/1970. 21 September 1970. 
 'Strobel, Heinrich', in Hugo Riemann, Riemann Musiklexikon Personenteil (1961), . 
 'Heinrich Strobel', in Die Musik in Geschichte und Gegenwart. Allgemeine Enzyklopädie der Musik. (Music in the Past and Present: General Encyclopedia of Music) Personenteil Volume 16 (2006), . 
 Deutsches Rundfunkarchiv(German Broadcasting Archive) (Ed.), 'Auftragskompositionen im Rundfunk 1946–1975' (Bild- und Tonträger-Verzeichnisse, Vol. 7), 1977. 
 Manuela Schwartz: '„Eine versunkene Welt“. Heinrich Strobel als Kritiker, Musikpolitiker, Essayist und Redner in Frankreich (1939–1944)', in Isolde von Foerster, Christoph Hust and Christoph-Hellmut Mahling (Eds), Musikforschung – Faschismus – Nationalsozialismus. Referate der Tagung Schloss Engers (8. bis 11. März, 2000) (Are Musik Verlag, Mainz 2001), . 
 Manuela Schwartz, 'Exil und Remigration im Wirken Heinrich Strobels', in Stefan Drees, Andreas Jakob und Stefan Orgas (Eds), Musik. Transfer. Kultur (Festschrift für Horst Weber) (Hildesheim, Olms 2009), ..
 Manuela Schwartz, 'Visionen und Pflichten eines Förderers neuer Musik. Heinrich Strobel im Licht seiner Korrespondenz', in Mitteilungen der Paul Sacher Stiftung April 2013, .
 Michael Custodis, Friedrich Geiger, Netzwerke der Entnazifizierung: Kontinuitäten im deutschen Musikleben am Beispiel von Werner Egk, Hilde und Heinrich Strobel'' (Waxmann Verlag, Münster/New York/Münich/Berlin 2013). , 9783830978435.

External links

References 

People from Regensburg
20th-century German musicologists
20th-century German journalists
German male journalists
1898 births
1970 deaths
German male writers